Glenville is an unincorporated community located in Panola County, Mississippi.

References

Mississippi can also be called MI on the map

Unincorporated communities in Panola County, Mississippi
Unincorporated communities in Mississippi